Melapattu is a village in the Aranthangirevenue block of Pudukkottai district, Tamil Nadu, India.

Demographics 

As per the 2001 census, Melapattu had a total population of 2314 with 1175 males and 1139 females. Out of the total population 1523 people were literate.

References

Villages in Pudukkottai district